Events from the year 1978 in Scotland.

Incumbents 

 Secretary of State for Scotland and Keeper of the Great Seal – Bruce Millan

Law officers 
 Lord Advocate – Ronald King Murray
 Solicitor General for Scotland – Lord McCluskey

Judiciary 
 Lord President of the Court of Session and Lord Justice General – Lord Emslie
 Lord Justice Clerk – Lord Wheatley
 Chairman of the Scottish Land Court – Lord Birsay, then Lord Elliott

Events 
 9 February – Gordon McQueen, 25-year-old Scotland central defender, becomes Britain's first £500,000 footballer in a transfer from Leeds United to Manchester United.
 13 April – Glasgow Garscadden by-election: Donald Dewar retains the seat for Labour with only a 3.6% swing to the Scottish National Party.
 31 May – Hamilton by-election: George Robertson retains the seat for Labour, thwarting a strong challenge from the SNP.
 16 July – the Strathspey Railway opens for regular tourist traffic, the oldest continuously operating steam-worked heritage railway in Scotland, from Boat of Garten to Aviemore.
 31 July – the Scotland Act 1978, to establish a Scottish Assembly, receives the Royal Assent.
 August – first production from the Dunlin oilfield in the North Sea.
 17 October – a cull of grey seals in the Orkney and Western Islands is reduced after a public outcry.
 26 October – Berwick and East Lothian by-election: Labour retains the seat with a swing of 0.8% from the Conservatives.
 25 November – first North Sea oil comes ashore at the Sullom Voe Terminal in Shetland via the Brent System pipeline.
 The ultranationalist group Siol nan Gaidheal is formed.

Births 
 16 March – Anneliese Dodds, Labour and Co-operative Member of Parliament (United Kingdom), Chair of the Labour Party (UK)
 30 March – Chris Paterson, rugby player
 3 May – Lawrence Tynes, American football player
 14 May – Emma Rochlin, field hockey defender
 20 June – Julie Fowlis, Gaelic folk singer
 21 July – Gary Teale, footballer
 25 October – Russell Anderson, footballer
 10 November – Ruth Davidson, leader of the Scottish Conservative and Unionist Party and Member of the Scottish Parliament
 Neil Forsyth, writer
 J. O. Morgan, poet

Deaths 
 16 May – Diana Hay, 23rd Countess of Erroll, noblewoman (born 1926 in Kenya)
 23 July –  Tommy McLaren, footballer (born 1949)
 30 July – John Mackintosh, Labour politician and advocate of devolution (born 1929)
 9 September – Hugh MacDiarmid, poet (born 1892)

The arts
 17 January – Rock band Simple Minds make their first live performance at Glasgow's Satellite City.
 July – First Edinburgh Jazz and Blues Festival.

See also 
 1978 in Northern Ireland

References 

 
Scotland
Years of the 20th century in Scotland
1970s in Scotland